The All Good Music Festival and Camp Out was a weekend-long event held annually in July. Since its inception in 1997, it had been held at venues along the Mid-Atlantic, including Trip's Farm (Terra Alta) Masontown, West Virginia, Brandywine, Maryland and most notably Marvin's Mountaintop. It moved to Legend Valley in Thornville, Ohio in 2012. All Good announced they would be taking a short hiatus in 2014 and not be having a festival. They returned in 2015 in Summit Point, West Virginia. Headlining acts were Primus, moe. and Cake. In 2016, it was announced the festival had been retired and would be replaced by a two-day event at Merriweather Post Pavilion.

Background

The event was organized by Walther Productions and included mostly jam and folk acts, though the festival had expanded its musical repertoire to include reggae, hip-hop fusion, bluegrass, funk, and rock.  The 15th Annual festival was held July 14–17, 2011 on Marvin's Mountain Top in Masontown, West Virginia. The lineup had included artists such as Furthur, Derek Trucks, Railroad Earth, Keller Williams, The Flaming Lips, Phil Lesh and Friends, Widespread Panic, Umphrey's McGee, The String Cheese Incident, Les Claypool, Ratdog, Moe., Lotus, Bassnectar, Old Crow Medicine Show, The New Deal, Grace Potter and the Nocturnals, Yonder Mountain String Band, Dark Star Orchestra, and Leftover Salmon.

The festival generally featured three performance spaces: the main stage, flanked by a smaller stage, and the Grassroots stage located by Shakedown Street. The two main stages in the concert area operated with no overlapping sets, allowing festival-goers the unique opportunity to see all of the music scheduled at the festival. The location of the main stage at the bottom of a hill created a natural amphitheater with the music from the stage projected to the maximum number of listeners sitting on the hill; the mountains of West Virginia serving as backdrop.

Legal action
A Virginia driver, Clay Lewin, crashed into a tent of sleeping women at the West Virginia festival site near Masontown in July 2011. Nicole Miller, 20, of South Carolina, died in the accident, with two friends severely injured—Yen Ton and Elizabeth Doran, both of Mount Pleasant, South Carolina. Lewin, of Cape Charles, Virginia, lost control of his pickup but blames parking and security agents who guided him to the "steep, grassy slope near tents and other vehicles."

Lewin, Ton, Doran and Kim Miller sued campground operator Marvin’s Mountaintop LLC; Walther Productions; California-based Tobin Productions; M&M Parking Inc. of Pennsylvania; and three security providers, Event Staffing Inc. of Virginia, National Event Services, Inc. of New Hampshire, and Axis Security Inc. of Tennessee. Some principals are being sued as individuals; all have denied culpability, filing counterclaims against each other.

Locations

On October 13, 2011, Tim Walther sent a request to Caroline County, VA to ask for a change in a music ordinance. He wanted to move the annual show from West Virginia to Moss Neck Manor, a 1,200-acre site in Port Royal, VA off U.S. 17 owned by the Silver Cos. The festival would feature 14 to 16 hours of music a day, twice as much as the county allows.

Line-up by year

See also
List of jam band music festivals

References

External links 

All Good Music Festival
AllGoodFestivalPhotos.com - Photos

Tourist attractions in Preston County, West Virginia
Music festivals in West Virginia
Music festivals in Virginia
Music festivals in Ohio
Jam band festivals
Music festivals established in 1997